This is a list of fossiliferous stratigraphic units in Tanzania.



List of fossiliferous stratigraphic units

See also 
 Lists of fossiliferous stratigraphic units in Africa
 List of fossiliferous stratigraphic units in the Democratic Republic of the Congo
 List of fossiliferous stratigraphic units in Madagascar
 List of fossiliferous stratigraphic units in Malawi
 List of fossiliferous stratigraphic units in Mozambique
 List of fossiliferous stratigraphic units in Seychelles
 List of fossiliferous stratigraphic units in Zambia
 Geology of Tanzania

References

Further reading 
Hatambulo Formation
 

Kilwa Group
 
 

Kingongo Marl
 

Mikindani Formation
 

Olduvai Formation
 
 
 
 
 

Pemba Formation
 

Peninj Gorge Group
 
 
 
 

Pugu Formation
 

Tanga Limestone
 

Wembere-Manonga Formation
 
 

Tanzania
 
 
Fossiliferous stratigraphic units
Fossil